ACHR may refer to:
American Convention on Human Rights
Arab Charter on Human Rights
Asian Centre for Human Rights
Acetylcholine receptor (AChR)
 Asian Coalition for Housing Rights
Australian Centre for Health Research
Access Center for Human Rights (ACHR)